Karateci Kız is a 1973 Turkish martial arts film.  Directed by Orhan Aksoy, the cast includes Filiz Akın and Ediz Hun.

In September 2012, the film gained notoriety in a viral video on YouTube that features the main character Zeynep (played by Akın) fatally shooting antagonist Ferruh (played by Bülent Kayabaş) multiple times as he lets out several drawn-out screams before dying. The video, entitled "Worst movie death scene ever", has gained more than 17 million views since being uploaded on 26 September 2012. Though the cited clip was edited from the original to add the long screams, viewers noted that the screams—as well as the slow-motion action of the actor being shot—only adds to the humor of the video. It was also parodied in the Regular Show episode "Every Meat Burritos".

Plot 
Zeynep lives with her old father. She has lost her ability to speak because of an accident. She needs an operation in order to be able to talk again. One day, five prison fugitives come to their house and kill Zeynep's father. The fugitives take their money and attack. Due to the shock, Zeynep regains her ability to speak. The fugitives are arrested but Zeynep wants to take revenge, therefore she says that the fugitives are not the ones who have attacked them. The police appoints Murat to make her give a statement. Murat teaches her how to use a gun and some karate, but she still doesn't know he is a cop. They fall in love and decide to get married. On their wedding, the prisoners kill Murat. Nothing can stop Zeynep now from taking revenge. She becomes a policewoman and traces the fugitives one by one.

Cast 
 Filiz Akın as Zeynep
 Ediz Hun as Murat Akdoğan
 Hayati Hamzaoğlu as Bekir Bulut
 Bülent Kayabaş as Ferruh
 Nubar Terziyan as Zeynep's Father
 Yesim Yükselen as Meral
 Kudret Karadağ as Riza Çakoz
 Oktay Yavuz as Kasim Arpaci

See also 
Bruceploitation
Kung fu film
Turksploitation

References

External links 

 Review and info at Backyard Asia

1970s Turkish-language films
1973 films
Rape and revenge films
Internet memes
1970s action films
Turkish action adventure films
Karate films
Viral videos
1973 martial arts films
1970s vigilante films
Turkish films about revenge
Turkish vigilante films
Girls with guns films
Films about deaf people